Stéphan Barron is a contemporary artist. He developed through his artworks since the 1980s the ideas of Planetary Art and Technoromanticism. Planetary Art is an art form which takes the Earth in its planetary dimension as its basis for artistic creation. Technoromanticism is the theory of links between art and new technologies, within the context of the threats posed to Nature by technoscience and economic development. Technoromanticism also seeks to analyse the return of the human body within technological arts, formulating the hypothesis that a technological society needs a corporeal rebalancing of perceptions.

"Stéphan Barron occupies, in Europe, a prominent place in the search for a spatio-temporal definition of the video image."

Selected works and projects 
All these artworks are documented in Stéphan Barron's HDR  on the Technoromanticism website.

Planetary artwork

Thaon/New York  
Satellite audio transmission and slow-scan TV between the medieval church of Thaon in Normandy, France, and The Cloisters in New York City - June 1987. Only satellite transmission by a European artist, this artwork anticipates global or planetary art which developed later with the internet.

Orient Express  
Stéphan Barron rode the Orient Express from Paris to Budapest and every hour took a Polaroid of what he saw. In Budapest the 25 Polaroids of that one-way trip were scanned on computer and sent to Paris by modem. The same process was used from Budapest to Paris, and the 25 digitised Polaroids of the return trip were sent from Paris to Budapest - Institut Français, Budapest October 1987 - New version, exhibition at OSTRALE / DRESDEN - sept. 2010.

Berlin / Peking 
Seven television sets showing images from the Berlin Wall and Berliners facing seven television sets showing images from China and the Great Wall.

Alice  
Transtlantic installation for the transinteractifs - Paris / Toronto - November 1988

Lines (Traits)  
Stephan Barron and Sylvia Hansmann followed the Greenwich Meridian by car from the English Channel to the Mediterranean Sea and from Villers-sur-Mer to Castillon de la Plana. With their car fax they regularly sent images and texts about their trip to other faxes located in eight different European locations (among them was Ars Electronica) - 1989.

Autoportrait  
In the exhibition space, a robot arrow indicated where Stephan Barron could be found. Stephan Barron built this telephone-operated robot in collaboration with the engineer Jerome Gilbert, a specialist in home automation - 1991.

Les plantes de mon jardin  
Every day, Stephan Barron sent images of the plants in his tiny garden from Hérouville in France by fax to Prague - Spala Galery, Prague - 1991.

À perte d’entendre  
Linked by walkie-talkie to the Brandenburg Gate, Stephan Barron walked away from it eight successive times in eight different directions. Each time he lost audio contact, he there and then took a Polaroid picture. The project was carried out at the Brandenburg Gate, symbol of the immaterial border between east and west - Sakchewsky Galery, Berlin - 1991.

Le bleu du ciel  
Two computers, one located in Tourcoing and the other in Toulon, were connected by telephone. They calculated in real time the average of the colours in the northern and southern skies. The same planetary interactive installation was shown between Paris and Munich in 1995 (Unesco Award) - Tourcoing School of Art - 1994.

Le jour et la nuit (Night and day)  
Two computers, one in Brazil, one in Australia, averaged the images of the skies of the two countries - Arte tecnologia, São Paulo - 1995.

Ozon  
Measurements taken of ozone produced by motor car pollution in the city of Lille, and measurements taken of ultraviolet radiation coming through the ozone layer were transformed into sounds via the Internet that were projected onto the streets of Roubaix and in the garden of the Old Treasury Building in Adelaide - Adelaide International Festival - 1996.

Eurotunnel  
Stéphan Barron and Sylvia Hansmann travel by boat across the English Channel directly above the path of the Channel Tunnel; at regular intervals they throw buoys equipped with beacons linked to satellites. This marking out of the Channel's path is eventually dispersed by the wind and ocean currents - Project.

Com-post  
Online artwork - Web surfers send in their texts by e-mail. Poetry, texts expressing love and hate or utopian views, all forms are accepted. All are then composed! http://www.com_post.org - 2000

Fusil  
Online artwork on guns  - 2003 - http://www.fusil.biz

corpo@corpo  
One of the first artworks using cell phone: MMS, SMS, email and digital photograph - Biennale de Venezia 2005.

wyfy®  
Video and performance - Biennale de Lyon 2007, FRUC.

Le Nouveau Voyage  
110 years after his ancestor's epic journey, Stéphan Barron takes the same route as seen by satellite. This work is presented as a performance-projection but can also be experienced more personally with mobile phone and the internet. Le FRUC - April 2009.

o-o-o  
Live performance and sound installation transforms in real time using singing voices measures of ozone from the GOME satellite spinning around earth and measures of ozone produced by city pollution in the exhibition center. Le FRUC - 2008.

Contact  
Two seemingly unconnected copper plates in two different locations. When someone places a hand on the first plate, the second will begin to warm up. FRUC & ECAP congress 2008.

Monochromes 
Monochromes draw the viewers into a pure perception of colour without the presence of a physical art work. One experiences the depth of pure colour - the colour within. 2012.

Thermochromes 
The thermochromes are hand imprints created with paint that disappears at human body temperature. They follow Stéphan Barron's installation contact.

3Dedalus
3D print sculpture of a Daedalean labyrinth. This cubic labyrinth is formed by stacking 25 QR codes tracing the path of Leopold Bloom, hero of James Joyce's Ulysses through the streets of Dublin. 2014.

Photography

Prières  
Installation of 14 digital photograph sized 120x160 in FRUC Artcenter, Montpellier - July 2003

Video Art

Baltic  
Videotape (18 min) + Sound of the stones and clash of primitive materials: earth, straw, grass and sky. Key words: Carnac, Zen garden, land-art, ready-made. Music: Deficit Des Années Anterieures - 1985

New York  
Videotape (4 min 30 sec) + New York, machine, mechanical constraints with muffled sounds. New York, energy, foaming and perpetual movement. New York, black and white mixing - Music: Vivenza -1985 -1986

Orient express  
Video performance-installation - 1987, Paris/Budapest. Shown in Stockholm in 1988

Wall 
Video environment made of 4 walls of 4 times 4 TV monitors. On the videos: close-up views of city walls. Meditation, concentration, expansion - 1987. Shown in Vidéoformes  04/87 Clermont-Ferrand, Opéra de Lille 09/87, Sigma de Bordeaux 11/87, Vidéo Art Plastique d’Hérouville 11/87, CAC de St Quentin en Yvelynes 01/88

C'est d'autres tiroirs  
Installation at Centre Culturel de Cherbourg - 1988

Nine 2 Five  
Video Installation vidéo - Caen and Vire - Octobre 1987/Mai 1988

Dans la chaleur des concept 
Stephan Barron puts a TV set showing fire in the middle of the Icking forest near Munich. Fire symbolizes the domination of man over nature (a reference to Prometheus) and the possible danger of technology for man's survival - 1988.

Signs of the times  
Seven pieces of blue novelatto marble measuring 0.7 x 1 m engraved with the principal symbols of video - 1993

In the space of a day  
Video process and installation about the space we go through in a day. - 1994

Thaon /New York  
Video on the 1987 satellite transmission - 1990

Dans la chaleur des concepts 
Video on the 1988 installation - 1990

Traits 
Video on the artwork from 1989 - Voice from Pierre Restany - 1990

Hommage au «Chaos»  
Video - 1993

Les plantes de mon jardin   
Video on the project - 1994

Transmission   
This video is made with the images of the slow-scan transmission Thaon / New York edited on the original sound transmission by the radio WNYC New York. The film is a succession of slow meditative images. These almost abstract images are like many black and white paintings slowly revealed. This film is an hypnotic artwork. - 2008

A perte d'entendre   
Linked by walkie-talkie to the Brandenburg Gate, Stéphan Barron walked away from it 8 successive times in 8 different directions. Each time he lost audio contact, he there and then took a Polaroid picture. The video is made with the 8 images and the sound from 91 - 2008

Le Nouveau Voyage   
Video on the planetary artwork «Le Nouveau Voyage» - 2009

Dvdremix  
Limited Edition of historical and new remixed video artwork by Stéphan Barron starting 2010

References

External links 

 Official website
 Youtube Channel
 Vimeo Channel

1961 births
Living people
French contemporary artists
French installation artists
20th-century French male artists
21st-century French male artists
French video artists
French digital artists
New media artists